Eilema fraterna is a moth of the subfamily Arctiinae first described by Arthur Gardiner Butler in 1887. It is found on the Solomon Islands.

References

fraterna